Stilbosis is a genus of moths in the family Cosmopterigidae.

Species
Stilbosis alcyonis Meyrick, 1917
Stilbosis alsocoma Meyrick, 1917
Stilbosis amphibola Walsingham, 1909
Stilbosis antibathra (Meyrick, 1914) 
Stilbosis argyritis Meyrick, 1922
Stilbosis chrysorrhabda Meyrick, 1922
Stilbosis condylota Meyrick, 1917
Stilbosis cyclocosma (Meyrick, 1921)
Stilbosis devoluta Meyrick, 1917
Stilbosis dulcedo (Hodges, 1964)
Stilbosis extensa (Braun, 1919)
Stilbosis gnomonica Meyrick, 1917
Stilbosis hypanthes Meyrick, 1917
Stilbosis incincta Walsingham, 1909
Stilbosis juvantis (Hodges, 1964)
Stilbosis juvenis Walsingham, 1909
Stilbosis lonchocarpella Busck, 1934
Stilbosis nubila Hodges, 1964
Stilbosis ornatrix Hodges, 1978
Stilbosis ostryaeella (Chambers, 1874)
Stilbosis pagina Hodges, 1978
Stilbosis phaeoptera Forbes, 1931
Stilbosis placatrix (Hodges, 1969)
Stilbosis polygoni Zeller, 1877
Stilbosis quadricustatella (Chambers, 1880) (syn: Stilbosis quadricristatella)
Stilbosis rhynchosiae (Hodges, 1964)
Stilbosis risor (Hodges, 1964)
Stilbosis rotunda Hodges, 1978
Stilbosis sagana (Hodges, 1964)
Stilbosis schmitzi B. Landry, 2008
Stilbosis scleroma Hodges, 1978
Stilbosis stipator (Hodges, 1964)
Stilbosis symphracta Meyrick, 1917
Stilbosis synclista Meyrick, 1917
Stilbosis tesquella Clemens, 1860 (syn: Stilbosis tesquatella Chambers, 1878, Laverna quinquicristatella Chambers, 1881)
Stilbosis turrifera Meyrick, 1921
Stilbosis venatrix (Hodges, 1964)
Stilbosis venifica (Hodges, 1964)
Stilbosis victor (Hodges, 1964)

References
Natural History Museum Lepidoptera genus database

Chrysopeleiinae
Moth genera